Hradištko is a municipality and village in Prague-West District in the Central Bohemian Region of the Czech Republic. It has about 2,300 inhabitants.

Administrative parts
Villages of Brunšov, Pikovice and Rajchardov are administrative parts of Hradištko.

Notable people
Magda Sonja (1886–1974), Austrian-American actress

References

Villages in Prague-West District